Paul Schoenfield, also spelled Paul Schoenfeld, is a classical composer.  He is known for combining popular, folk, and classical music forms.

Schoenfield was born in 1947 in Detroit, Michigan.  He began to take piano lessons at the age of six, and wrote his first composition a year later. Among his teachers were Julius Chajes, Ozan Marsh and Rudolf Serkin. He holds a B.A. degree from Carnegie-Mellon University and a Doctor of Music Arts degree from the University of Arizona.

Schoenfield was formerly an active concert pianist, as a soloist and with groups including Music from Marlboro. With violinist Sergiu Luca he recorded the complete violin and piano works of Béla Bartók. He gave the premiere of his piano concerto Four Parables with the Toledo Symphony in 1983. Jeffrey Kahane recorded the work in 1994 with John Nelson and the New World Symphony. Also on the Argo CD are Vaudeville, Schoenfeld's concerto for piccolo trumpet,  played by Wolfgang Basch, and Klezmer Rondos, concerto for flute, baritone and orchestra, performed by flutist Carol Wincenc. Critic Raymond Tuttle called the CD: "Some of the most life-affirming new music I've heard in a long time", while he characterized Four Parables as "wild silliness in the face of existential dread."

Andreas Boyde gave the European premiere of Four Parables in 1998 with the Dresdner Sinfoniker and Jonathan Nott, a live performance which was issued on the Athene Records label in 1999. In 2008 the work was released on Black Box Classics with Andrew Russo and the Prague Philharmonia led by JoAnn Falletta.  Also on the CD Russo plays Four Souvenirs with violinist James Ehnes and the piano trio Café Music with Ehnes and cellist Edward Arron. Café Music was commissioned by the St. Paul Chamber Orchestra and inspired by Schoenfeld's turn as house pianist at Murray's steakhouse in Minneapolis, Minnesota. It received its premiere during an SPCO chamber concert in January, 1987 with Schoenfeld at the piano.

In 1994, the same year he was awarded the Cleveland Arts Prize, an evening of Schoenfield's pieces was presented at Reinberger Hall by violinist Lev Polyakin and other members of the Cleveland Orchestra with the composer at the piano. Cleveland Orchestra principal violist Robert Vernon gave the world premiere of Schoenfield's viola concerto in 1998, and made the premiere recording, released on Naxos Records in the same year.

Schoenfield's two-act opera, The Merchant and the Pauper, was commissioned by the Opera Theatre of Saint Louis and given its premiere there in 1999. Its libretto is adapted from a tale fashioned and first told in 1809 by one of the most significant personalities in Hassidic history, philosophy, and lore- Rabbi Nachman of Bratslav (1772-1811), the founder of the Bratslaver Hassidic sect.

Schoenfield's song cycle Camp Songs was commissioned by Seattle's Music of Remembrance (MOR). It was a Pulitzer Prize finalist in 2003. The song cycle Ghetto Songs, commissioned by MOR, was recorded in 2009 by Naxos.

In 2010 Schoenfield's Sonata for Violin and Piano was premiered at Lincoln Center with Cho-Liang Lin, violin, and Jon Kimura Parker, piano.

Schoenfield is a Professor of Composition at the University of Michigan. He is also a dedicated scholar of the Talmud and of mathematics.

References

External links
 University of Michigan bio
 Milken Archive of Jewish Music profile
 

Living people
1947 births
University of Michigan faculty
American male classical composers
American classical composers
20th-century classical composers
21st-century classical composers
Musicians from Detroit
Carnegie Mellon University alumni
University of Arizona alumni
21st-century American composers
20th-century American composers
American classical pianists
Jewish American classical composers